The 2017–18 San Jose Sharks season was the 27th season for the National Hockey League franchise that was established on May 9, 1990.

Standings

Schedule

Preseason
The preseason schedule was announced on June 15, 2017.

Regular season
The regular season schedule was announced on June 22, 2017.

Playoffs

The Sharks entered the playoffs as the Pacific Division's third seed and faced the second seed of the same division, the Anaheim Ducks. The Sharks swept the Ducks and were then defeated by the Vegas Golden Knights in six games in the conference semifinals.

Player statistics
Skaters

Goaltenders

†Denotes player spent time with another team before joining the Sharks. Stats reflect time with the Sharks only.
‡Traded/Waived mid-season

Transactions

Trades

Free agents acquired

Free agents lost

Lost via waivers

Player signings

Draft picks

Below are the San Jose Sharks' selections at the 2017 NHL Entry Draft, held on June 23 and 24, 2017 at the United Center in Chicago.

Notes:
 The Boston Bruins' second-round pick went to the San Jose Sharks as the result of a trade on June 17, 2017 that sent Mirco Mueller and a fifth-round pick in 2017 to New Jersey in exchange for Nashville's fourth-round pick in 2017 and this pick.
 The Florida Panthers' fourth-round pick went to the San Jose Sharks as the result of a trade on June 24, 2017, that sent Nashville's fourth-round pick and a sixth-round pick both in 2017 (123rd and 174th overall) to the New York Rangers in exchange for this pick.
 The Arizona Coyotes' sixth-round pick went to the San Jose Sharks as the result of a trade on June 20, 2016 that sent a fourth-round pick in 2016 and Detroit's third-round pick in 2017 to Arizona in exchange for Maxim Letunov and this pick.
 The Nashville Predators' sixth-round pick went to the San Jose Sharks as the result of a trade on June 24, 2017, that sent San Jose and Ottawa's seventh-round picks in 2017 (205th and 214th overall) to New Jersey in exchange for this pick.
 The Chicago Blackhawks' seventh-round pick went to the San Jose Sharks as the result of a trade on March 2, 2015 that sent Andrew Desjardins to Chicago in exchange for Ben Smith and this pick (being conditional at the time of the trade). The condition – San Jose will receive a seventh-round pick in 2017 if Chicago wins the Stanley Cup in 2015 – was converted on June 15, 2015.

Awards

References

San Jose Sharks seasons
San Jose Sharks
San Jose Sharks
San Jose Sharks